Security Force Assistance (SFA) is an American term for United States military advisor assistance with "training, equipping and advising allied or 'partner' militaries to enable them to defend themselves without 100,000 Americans on the ground to do it for them." SFA is used when improving the security of the host country aligns with the national interests of the donor country. It may be used alongside or instead of larger commitments of the donor country's military personnel and material. This means SFA can provide an alternative to large-scale operations if a war becomes controversial or politically difficult.

Definition 

US Army Field Manual 3-07.1 defines SFA as "the unified action to generate, employ, and sustain local, host nation, or regional security forces in support of a legitimate authority" and says it can be applied to any organization "that provide(s) security for a host nation and its relevant population or support a regional security organization's mission".

SFA is linked to, though distinct from, Foreign Internal Defense (FID). It is a common misconception that the two are the same. One difference between the two is that FID is chiefly smaller-scale and the domain of Special Operations Forces (SOF), and SFA is chiefly larger-scale and the domain of conventional forces, but neither exclusively so. Differences may also be found in that FID is a tactical mission of irregular warfare (IW), giving focus on the local population facing internal threats, whereas SFA is an operational or strategic mission that falls under conventional warfare and focuses on state-level forces that may be both internal and external. Where FID was carried out for decades by special operations forces during the Cold War, the United States developed SFA beginning in about 2006. Given the relative youth of the concept of SFA, and that the experiences of SOF with FID would inform the practice of SFA during its infancy, one can understand there would likely be difficulty in distinguishing the two until SFA has matured in and of itself.

History 

Although SFA is relatively new as a concept within western military doctrine, it has been practiced as long as states have had the technology and power to carry it out. Historical examples of SFA are the role of France in the American Revolutionary War and the Cuban intervention in Angola. The modern concept of SFA, however, is intrinsically linked to the International Security Assistance Force in the War in Afghanistan and the NATO Training Mission of the Iraq War. These conflicts gave rise to the current understanding of SFA, and the strategies employed within them also led to the need to define SFA and how to approach it within US military doctrine.

 
FID, which can be seen as the tactical-level equivalent to the strategic-level SFA, also has a long history. It was employed often during the Cold War by units such as United States Army Special Forces. This can be seen in Project 404 and the role of the 8th Special Forces Group in assisting Bolivia to fight the Ñancahuazú Guerrilla. The US Army Special Forces were enlarged and directed to focus on FID by President John F. Kennedy to counter the global influence of the Soviet Union and to prevent Communist insurgencies gaining power abroad, motivated by thinking based upon domino theory. In fact, FID has been a core part of the role of modern SOF units since they came into being.

Following their initial invasions, both the War in Afghanistan and the Iraq War developed into guerrilla wars, with the US-led allies in both conflicts primarily carrying out counterinsurgency and nation-building thereafter. The importance of SFA in the subsequent strategy of the Western forces can be seen in the respective formation of the International Security Assistance Force and NATO Training Mission – Iraq. The key role of SFA in US strategy in the War on Terror and lack of existing SFA doctrine meant that it had to be developed; this began in approximately 2007 to 2008.

The importance of SFA within NATO's approach to the War on Terror has led to NATO countries prioritizing the development of their SFA capabilities with dedicated units. For example, the United States Army began to create its Security Force Assistance Brigades (SFABs) within Security Force Assistance Command in 2018. Similarly, the United Kingdom established both the 11th Security Force Assistance Brigade and British Army Ranger Regiment in 2021, both of which specialize in SFA and FID.

British and U.S. units and formations 

Below is an incomplete list of units that today specialize in SFA or FID as one part of a wider SFA strategy.

United Kingdom 

 United Kingdom Special Forces
 Army Special Operations Brigade
 11th Security Force Assistance Brigade
 1st Battalion, Irish Guards (2022-26)

United States of America 

 Security Force Assistance Command
 Security Force Assistance Brigades
 United States Army Special Forces
 1st Special Forces Command (Airborne)
 Joint Special Operations Command
 United States Navy SEALs
 United States Naval Special Warfare Command

See also 

 Unconventional warfare
 Nation-building
 Military Assistance Advisory Group
 Military advisor
 War on terror
 Lend-Lease 
 List of foreign aid to Ukraine during the Russo-Ukrainian War

References

External links 

 Distinguishing Between Security Force Assistance & Foreign Internal Defense
 Security Force Assistance and the Concept of Sustainable Training as a Role for the U.S. Military in Today’s World
 What is Security Force Assistance & What is JCISFA
 Army Security Force Assistance Brigades (SFABs)
 Security Force Assistance Operations: Defining the Advise and Assist Brigade
 What’s in a name? Clarifying the Divide between Military Assistance and Security Force Assistance

United States Department of Defense doctrine
Military advisors
Military intervention
Foreign intervention
Counterinsurgency